Mykhaylo Ivanovych Hotra (born 20 April 2000) is a Ukrainian professional footballer who plays as a goalkeeper for Hungarian club Kisvárda.

References

External links
 
 

2000 births
Living people
Place of birth missing (living people)
Ukrainian footballers
Association football goalkeepers
FC Karpaty Lviv players
FC Uzhhorod players
Kisvárda FC players
Ukrainian First League players
Ukrainian Second League players
Ukrainian expatriate footballers
Expatriate footballers in Hungary
Ukrainian expatriate sportspeople in Hungary